Nathaniel S. Robinson, Sr., (March 27, 1827November 5, 1908) was an American physician and Republican politician.  During the American Civil War, he served as a surgeon for the Union Army.

Biography

Born in Dover, Maine, Robinson graduated from Bowdoin College and earned his medical degree from Harvard Medical School in 1852.  In 1858, he moved to Neenah, Wisconsin, and practiced medicine there for most of the rest of his life. During the American Civil War, he was the assistant surgeon and then the surgeon of the 1st Wisconsin Cavalry Regiment. In 1875, Robison served as a Republican in the Wisconsin State Assembly.

Robinson died at his home in Neenah on November 5, 1908, after a period of disability.  He was survived by his wife and three children.

Electoral history

| colspan="6" style="text-align:center;background-color: #e9e9e9;"| General Election, November 3, 1874

References

 

1827 births
Year of death unknown
People from Dover-Foxcroft, Maine
Politicians from Neenah, Wisconsin
People of Wisconsin in the American Civil War
Harvard Medical School alumni
Physicians from Wisconsin
Republican Party members of the Wisconsin State Assembly
Physicians from Maine